The Night Visitor is Swedish singer-songwriter Anna Ternheim's fifth album, released on October 28, 2011.

Track listing

CD2 – Live on the Porch

Chart performance
In its first week of release, the album entered Sverigetopplistan, the official Swedish Albums Chart straight in at No. 2. It was also released the same week in Norway, entering VG-lista, the official Norwegian Albums Chart straight at No. 20.

Weekly charts

Year-end charts

References

External links
Anna Ternheim – The Night Visitor (Official site)

2011 albums